Hosby is a village in Lääne-Nigula Parish, Lääne County, in western Estonia. Before the administrative reform in 2017, the village was in Noarootsi Parish.

References
 

Villages in Lääne County